Kirby Moore is an American football coach and former player who is the offensive coordinator of Missouri Tigers

Early life and playing career
Moore grew up in Prosser, Washington and attended Prosser High School. He was a four-year starter for the football team, which was coached by his father. Moore was named the Washington 2A Player of the Year as a senior after catching 131 passes for 2,126 yards and 34 touchdowns. He finished his high school career with 304 receptions for 4,909 yards and national high school record 95 touchdowns.

Moore followed his older brother Kellen and played college football at Boise State for five seasons. He caught 21 passes for 242 yards and two touchdowns as a freshman. Moore redshirted his true sophomore season. He had 22 receptions for 247 yards with one touchdown as a redshirt sophomore. Moore was the Broncos' second-leading receiver during his redshirt junior season 36 receptions and 368 receiving yards. He missed half of his redshirt senior season to a foot injury. Moore finished his college playing career with 115 receptions for 1,137 and six touchdowns in 45 games played.

Coaching career
Moore began his coaching career as a wide receivers coach at the College of Idaho when the school revived its football program in 2014. He was hired as an offensive graduate assistant at Washington the following season, reuniting him with former Boise State head coach Chris Petersen.

Moore was hired as the wide receivers coach at Fresno State in 2017. He remained on staff after head coach Jeff Tedford resigned and was named passing game coordinator in addition to wide receivers coach by new head coach Kalen DeBoer. Moore was promoted offensive coordinator in December 2021 after DeBoer left Fresno State to become the head coach at Washington and Tedford was re-hired.

On January 4, 2023, Moore was reportedly hired as offensive coordinator for the University of Missouri, serving under head coach Eliah Drinkwitz.

References

External links
 Boise State Broncos player bio
 Fresno State Bulldogs coaching bio

Living people
American football wide receivers
Boise State Broncos football players
Fresno State Bulldogs football coaches
College of Idaho Coyotes football coaches
Washington Huskies football coaches
People from Prosser, Washington
Coaches of American football from Washington (state)
Year of birth missing (living people)